Lü Kai (died 225), courtesy name Jiping, was an official of the state of Shu Han during the Three Kingdoms period of China.

Background
Lü Kai was from Buwei County (不韋縣), Yongchang Commandery (永昌郡), which is located northeast of present-day Baoshan, Yunnan. He was allegedly from the same clan as Lü Buwei, a statesman of the Qin state in the Warring States period who was exiled to the Shu region (present-day Sichuan) after his fall from power.

Service in Shu Han
Lü Kai started his career as an Officer of Merit (功曹) in the bureau for general purposes in Yongchang Commandery's office.

After Liu Bei, the founding emperor of the Shu Han (or Shu) state, died in June 223, Yong Kai (雍闓), a tribal chief active in Shu's Nanzhong region (covering parts of present-day Yunnan, Guizhou and southern Sichuan), became more aggressive and rebellious towards the Shu state. During this time, the Shu general Li Yan wrote a total of six letters to Yong Kai to dissuade him from rebelling but only received an arrogant response from the latter. Yong Kai also pledged allegiance to Shu's ally-turned-rival state Eastern Wu (or Wu); in return, the Wu ruler Sun Quan appointed him as the Administrator of Yongchang Commandery (永昌郡; covering parts of present-day western Yunnan) even though Yongchang was under Shu control.

Yongchang Commandery was located in the far southwest of Shu and was rather isolated from the Shu imperial capital, Chengdu, because the connecting roads were usually difficult to travel on or totally untraversable. When Yong Kai showed up to take control of Yongchang, Lü Kai and his colleague Wang Kang (王伉) refused to recognise his legitimacy and led both the local government and civilians alike to resist Yong Kai and prevent him from entering the commandery.

When Yong Kai repeatedly wrote declarations in his attempt to convince everyone that he was the rightful Administrator of Yongchang Commandery, Lü Kai wrote a reply to him as follows: 

As the people of Yongchang Commandery highly regarded and trusted him, Lü Kai was able to maintain control over Yongchang and fulfil his loyalty as a subject of Shu.

In the spring of 225, the Shu regent Zhuge Liang led an army on a southern campaign into the Nanzhong region to quell the rebellions and deal with intrusions by the Nanman tribes. While the Shu army was on its way, Yong Kai was slain by the subordinates of Gao Ding (高定), another rebel leader.

By the autumn of 225, Zhuge Liang had completely pacified Nanzhong and restored peace in the area. He then wrote a memorial to the Shu emperor Liu Shan as follows: "Lü Kai, Wang Kang and other officials in Yongchang Commandery maintained their loyalty towards the State despite being stuck in a remote location for over 10 years. When Yong Kai and Gao Ding started rebellions in the northeast, Lü Kai stood by their allegiance to the State and refused to have any dealings with the rebels. I am so surprised that there exists such a culture of loyalty and righteousness here in Yongchang."

Lü Kai was later appointed as the Administrator of Yunnan Commandery (雲南郡; covering parts of present-day Chuxiong, Dali and Lijiang in Yunnan), and enfeoffed as the Marquis of Yangqian Village (陽遷亭侯). Lü Kai's colleague, Wang Kang (王伉), later became the Administrator of Yongchang Commandery and was also enfeoffed as a village marquis.

Death and legacy
Lü Kai was killed by insurgents in Yunnan Commandery. His son, Lü Xiang (呂祥), inherited his peerage as the Marquis of Yangqian Village. Lü Xiang served under the Jin dynasty after the end of the Three Kingdoms period and held the position of Colonel of the Southern Barbarians (南夷校尉). His son and descendants served as the Administrator of Yongchang Commandery generation after generation.

In the fourth century, when Li Xiong, the founder of the Cheng state, led his forces to invade Ning Prefecture (寧州; covering present-day Yunnan and Guizhou), Lü Kai's descendants refused to surrender and led the people of Yongchang Commandery to resist the invaders.

Appraisal
Chen Shou, who wrote Lu Kai's biography in the Records of the Three Kingdoms (Sanguozhi), appraised him as follows: "Lu Kai never differed of his path to integrity... Along with Huang Quan, Li Hui, Ma Zhong, Wang Ping, Zhang Ni, It was thanks to their qualities that they were all well known through the empire and because they seized the opportunity given to them that they left strong legacies."

See also
 Lists of people of the Three Kingdoms

Notes

References

 Chen, Shou (3rd century). Records of the Three Kingdoms (Sanguozhi).
 
 Pei, Songzhi (5th century). Annotations to Records of the Three Kingdoms (Sanguozhi zhu).
 

Year of birth unknown
225 deaths
Shu Han politicians
People from Baoshan, Yunnan
Han dynasty politicians from Yunnan
Political office-holders in Yunnan